The United Kingdom of Great Britain and Northern Ireland competed as Great Britain at the 1994 Winter Olympics in Lillehammer, Norway.

Medallists

Competitors
The following is the list of number of competitors in the Games.

Alpine skiing

Men

Women

Biathlon

Men

Bobsleigh

Cross-country skiing

Men

Figure skating

Men

Women

Pairs

Ice Dancing

Freestyle skiing

Men

Women

Luge

Men

Short track speed skating

Men

Women

References

Official Olympic Reports
International Olympic Committee results database

Nations at the 1994 Winter Olympics
1994 Winter Olympics
Winter Olympics
Winter sports in the United Kingdom